The Last Tycoon Stakes  (formerly known as the Inglewood Handicap) is an American Thoroughbred horse race run annually in late April at Hollywood Park Racetrack in Inglewood, California. First run in 1938, the race is open to horses three years old and up. A Grade III stakes, it is raced on turf at a distance of   miles (8.5 Furlongs). The event currently offers a purse of $100,000.

The Last Tycoon Stakes was run in two divisions in 1975, 1976, 1978, and 1979.

The race was increased in length to 1 and 1/8th mile in 2012.

Records
Most wins:
 3 - Native Diver (1963, 1964, 1966)

Winners since 1999

Earlier winners

 1997 - El Angelo
 1996 - Fastness
 1995 - Blaze O'Brien
 1994 - Gothland
 1993 - The Tender Track
 1992 - Golden Pheasant
 1991 - Tight Spot
 1990 - Mohamed Abdu
 1989 - Steinlen
 1988 - Steinlen
 1987 - Le Belvedere
 1986 - Zoffany
 1985 - Al Mamoon
 1984 - Royal Heroine
 1983 - Bold Style
 1982 - Maipon
 1981 - Bold Tropic
 1980 - Red Crescent
 1979 - Johnny's Image
 1979 - Star Spangled
 1978 - Star Spangled
 1978 - Star of Erin
 1977 - Today N Tomorrow
 1976 - Riot In Paris
 1976 - King Pellinore
 1975 - El Botija
 1975 - Gay Style
 1974 - Shirley's Champion
 1973 - Ancient Title
 1972 - War Heim
 1971 - Advance Guard
 1970 - Baffle
 1969 - Rising Market
 1968 - Gamely
 1967 - Quicken Tree
 1967 - Pretense
 1966 - Native Diver
 1965 - Tronado
 1964 - Native Diver
 1963 - Native Diver
 1962 - Prove It
 1961 - Sea Orbit
 1960 - Bagdad
 1959 - Bug Brush
 1958 - Eddie Schmidt
 1957 - Find
 1956 - Swaps
 1955 - Determine
 1954 - High Scud
 1953 - Pet Bully
 1952 - Sturdy One
 1951 - Sturdy One
 1950 - Miche
 1949 - Ace Admiral
 1948 - With Pleasure
 1947 - Artillery
 1946 - Quick Reward
 1945 - High Resolve
 1941 - Sir Jeffrey
 1940 - Historical
 1939 - Specify
 1938 - Ligaroti

References
 The 2008 Inglewood Handicap at the NTRA
 Inglewood Handicap at Pedigree Query

Horse races in California
Hollywood Park Racetrack
Graded stakes races in the United States
Open mile category horse races
Turf races in the United States
Recurring sporting events established in 1938